LORAN-C transmitter George serves the GRI 5990 (Canadian West Coast) and GRI 9940 (US West Coast) chains. Transmission power is 1600 kW. It is located at George, Washington, USA.
It went into service in September 1976. In December 2003 its tube transmitters were replaced with solid state units.

External links
 https://web.archive.org/web/20120210192709/http://www.locusinc.com/library/2004%20Nuts%20Bolts%202.pdf
 https://web.archive.org/web/20120206010820/http://www.megapulse.com/chaininfo.html

George
1976 establishments in Washington (state)